A star diagonal, erecting lens or diagonal mirror is an angled mirror or prism used in telescopes that allows viewing from a direction that is perpendicular to the usual eyepiece axis. It allows more convenient and comfortable viewing when the telescope is pointed at, or near the zenith (i.e. directly overhead).  Also, the resulting image is right side up, but is reversed from left to right.

Types of diagonals
Star diagonals are available in 0.965", 1.25", and 2" diameters. The 2" diagonals allow longer-focal length, low-power 2" barrel eyepieces for a wider field of view. Star diagonals come in all price ranges, from as low as a few dollars up to hundreds of dollars.

Mirror (reflective) diagonals
These diagonals (often called star diagonals) use a mirror set at a 45° angle inside the diagonal to turn the telescope's image at a 90° angle to the rear cell. Mirror diagonals produce an image in the eyepiece that is correctly oriented vertically, but is reversed left-to-right horizontally. This causes image reversal, the view in the eyepiece is flipped left-right. The major advantage to mirror diagonals is that they cost less to produce to a high degree of optical accuracy compared to a prism and that they do not introduce any color errors to the image. The major disadvantage of mirror diagonals is that unless the reflective coating is properly applied they can scatter light rendering lower image contrast compared to a 90° prism. Also they deteriorate with age as the reflective surface oxidizes. The newer Dielectric mirrors have largely solved the deterioration problem, and if properly made the Dielectric mirrors scatter less light compared to conventional mirrors. With short-focal length instruments, a mirror diagonal is preferred over a prism.

Prism diagonals
A prism diagonal uses a simple 90°-angle prism, pentaprism, or an Amici roof prism rather than a mirror to bend the optical path.

On telescopes with a longer focal ratios, a well-made 90° prism diagonal is the optimum choice to deliver the highest image contrast short of using the telescope without a diagonal entirely. However, prisms seem to be falling out of favor probably due to marketing forces that have been favoring short-focal length instruments, which tend to function better with a mirror diagonal. In some special cases however, the color dispersion effects of a prism diagonal can be used to advantage to improve the performance of undercorrected refractor objectives (regardless of focal length) by shifting the spherical and color correction of the objective closer to the design optimum. The natural color dispersion properties (overcorrection) of the prism works to lessen or nullify  the undercorrection of the objective lens.

On the other hand, a well-made conventional 90° prism star diagonal can transmit as much or more light as a mirror, and do so with higher image contrast since there is no possibility of light scattering from a reflective metallic surface as in a mirror diagonal. Also a prism will never degrade over time as a mirror will since there is no reflective metal coating to degrade from oxidation. However, prism diagonals may introduce chromatic aberration when used with short focal-length scopes although this is not a problem with the popular Schmidt-Cassegrain and Maksutov-Cassegrain telescopes, which have long focal lengths.

Pentaprism
A pentaprism provides the same inverted image orientation as viewing without a diagonal would. A simple 90°-angle prism provides the same "flipped" or mirror reversed image as a mirror diagonal. Pentaprism diagonals are extremely difficult to find.

Amici prism

An Amici prism is a type of roof prism which splits the image in two parts and thus allows an upright image without left-right mirroring. This means that what is seen in the eyepiece is the same as what is seen when looking at the sky, or a star chart or lunar map.

The disadvantage of typical "correct image" Amici roof prism diagonals is that because the light path bounces around through a piece of glass, the total amount of light transmitted is less and the multiple reflections required can introduce optical aberrations. At higher magnifications (>100×), brighter objects have a bright line through the object viewed. Therefore, most Amici roof prisms are more appropriate for low-power viewing or in spotting scopes for terrestrial rather than astronomical use. But with low-power usage with a rich field, the field can easily be compared with star charts, as it is no mirror image.

They are available in two types: with a 90º angle (like an ordinary star diagonal) and with a 45º angle. Such prisms are often used in spotting scopes for terrestrial viewing, mostly with a 45º angle. Such telescopes rarely use magnifications over 60×.

Alignment
Even an expensive star diagonal will deliver poor performance if it is not in alignment with the optical axis of the telescope. A telescope in perfect collimation will be thrown out of collimation by a misaligned star diagonal and often this misalignment will determine the image quality of the telescope to a larger extent than the surface accuracy of the prism or mirror. Since the mirror or prism of the star diagonal is located nearly at the focal plane of the instrument, surface accuracy of greater that 1/4 wave is more in the line of advertising than any increase in optical performance. A 1/10 wave mirror or prism star diagonal that throws off the collimation of the telescope will perform worse than a 1/2 wave star diagonal that is in proper alignment.

See also
 Herschel Wedge
 Amici prism
 List of telescope parts and construction

References

Optical components